Alexandre Rodrigues may refer to:
 Alexandre Rodrigues (actor) (born 1983), Brazilian actor
 Alexandre Rodrigues (handballer) (born 1980), Brazilian handball player
 Alexandre Rodrigues Ferreira, Portuguese naturalist
 Alexandre Rodrigues da Silva, known as Alexandre Pato, Brazilian footballer